Denno is a comune in Trentino, Italy.

Denno may also refer to:

Law
Stovall v. Denno, a 1967 United States Supreme Court case

People
Dale Denno (1950–2019), American politician
Deborah Denno (born 1952), American legal scholar
Robert Denno (1945–2008), American insect ecologist

Television
Dennō Bōkenki Webdiver, Japanese mecha anime series
Dennō Coil, Japanese science fiction anime series
Dennō Senshi Porygon, episode of the first season of the Pokémon! series

See also
Deno (disambiguation)
Cyberteam in Akihabara, a Japanese science fiction anime series also known as Akihabara Dennō Gumi
Dennos Museum Center, a fine art museum in Traverse City, Michigan